Taitou, formerly, is a newly built village in Gaocun township, Wuqing District, Tianjin.

Location 
Located just two kilometres from the Gaocun exit of the Jingjintang Expressway, Taitou offers excellent transportation links to Beijing and Tianjin.

Taitou is a vibrant community of relocated farmers surrounded by agricultural land and thousands of vacant new buildings. Many of the empty buildings in the surrounding area were constructed during a speculative real estate bubble in the early 2010s. While occupancy rates in Taitou are very high, occupancy rates of housing and shopping malls in the surrounding area are still extremely low. The surrounding area could be described as a Chinese ghost city.

In late 2018, house prices dropped from 15,384 Chinese yuan per square metre to 11,771 Chinese yuan per square metre in just two months.

Commercial activity

Within Taitou residential compound 

 Spa, building 2
Skincare products, building 7
Printing and photocopying, building 10
 Sauna, spa and massage parlour, building 13
 Hairdresser, building 17

In Taitou building 21 (commercial space) 

 Medical clinic (basic supplies and limited opening hours)
 China Post
 Agricultural Bank of China
 Broadband service centre

Outside Taitou North Gate 

 Family Destiny Restaurant (known colloquially by the expatriate community as the "Dirty Dragon")
 Beef hotpot restaurant
 Real estate agent
 Lanzhou Lamian restaurant (halal)
 Massage parlour
 Two mobile jianbing vendors (mornings only)
 Electric rickshaws waiting for passengers

For safety reasons, no cars are permitted to enter this gate. Pedestrians, bicycles (including electric bikes) and electric rickshaws are allowed.

Outside Taitou West Gate 

 Guard sentry
 Intercity bus stop

Around Taitou 

 Crematorium
 Work yard with agricultural equipment and farm animals
Road corn

Widsom Plaza 

 Face-to-Face Noodle Bar
 Beijing Institute of Big Data Research
 Apple'tree (restaurant and yoga studio)
 GreenGo electric car rental service

Online retailers 
Most couriers do not ship to Taitou due to its remote location. Only SF Express, JD.com and China Post deliver mail to addresses in Taitou. Other couriers usually deposit Taitou-addressed mail at Hexiwu (11 km away), Gaocun (3 km away) or Haileybury International School (1.25 km away) and notify the intended recipient of the item's location by SMS.

JD.com has a near monopoly for online groceries because it is the only online grocery company willing to ship to Taitou. JD.com's grocery products (which include cabbages, eggs, electronic items and frozen fish) are available for same-day or next-day delivery to Taitou.

Map

Air quality 
The air quality as measured by the air quality index (AQI) in nearby Langfang varies from excellent to severely polluted. In summer months, the AQI is usually around 100, while in winter months, AQI of 300+ is common. In May 2017, the AQI of Langfang and other cities in the Jingjinji area exceeded an extremely hazardous 1000 points.
The lack of an extremely polluted winter in 2017/18 is owed to policies from the central Chinese government that placed severe restrictions on heavily-polluting manufacturing plants and coal furnaces used for heating.

Renovation process of 2016-17 
Shortly after construction of the Taitou residential compound was completed, and after residents had moved in, major renovation works were carried out on the exterior walls of all 21 buildings at Taitou.

The process included:

 Chipping away the existing stone cladding
 Removing the old Rockwool insulation material from the external walls
 Installing new, upgraded Rockwool insulation material to the external walls
 Painting the exterior walls white
 Painting the exterior walls black
 Covering every face of every building with masking tape in a brickwork pattern
 Painting the buildings beige then peeling off the masking tape to reveal a brickwork pattern

The exterior wall renovation process took nearly 12 months to complete, during which, the compound was littered with dust, rubble and debris. After the exterior wall insulation was finished, workers planted hundreds of trees and bushes around the residential compound.

Haileybury International School used some of the Taitou debris as material for its elective handicraft activity.

References 

Geography of Tianjin
Communities of China